Oleksiy Hennadiyovych Antonov (born 8 May 1986) is a Ukrainian retired football forward and current manager.

Career
On 12 June 2014, Antonov joined Kazakhstan Premier League side Aktobe on a 2.5year contract. After a year with Aktobe, Antonov signed a two-year contract with Azerbaijan Premier League side Gabala FK on 19 June 2015. Antonov parted company with Gabala on 19 July 2016.

On 1 March 2017, Antonov signed a six-month contract with Gyirmót SE. His contract was terminated on 4 May 2017.

Career statistics

Club

International

Statistics accurate as of match played 22 May 2014

References

External links 
Player profile

1986 births
Living people
People from Pavlohrad
Ukrainian football managers
Ukrainian footballers
Ukraine international footballers
Ukraine under-21 international footballers
Ukraine youth international footballers
FC Kuban Krasnodar players
FC Metalist Kharkiv players
FC Zorya Luhansk players
FC Dnipro players
FC Dnipro-2 Dnipropetrovsk players
FC Mariupol players
FC Kryvbas Kryvyi Rih players
FC Chornomorets Odesa players
FC Aktobe players
Gabala FC players
Ukrainian Premier League players
Kazakhstan Premier League players
Azerbaijan Premier League players
Ukrainian expatriate footballers
Expatriate footballers in Russia
Expatriate footballers in Kazakhstan
Expatriate footballers in Azerbaijan
Ukrainian expatriate sportspeople in Russia
Ukrainian expatriate sportspeople in Azerbaijan
Ukrainian expatriate sportspeople in Kazakhstan
Association football forwards
Gyirmót FC Győr players
Expatriate footballers in Hungary
Ukrainian expatriate sportspeople in Hungary
FK Ventspils players
Expatriate footballers in Latvia
Ukrainian expatriate sportspeople in Latvia
FC Chornomorets Odesa managers
Sportspeople from Dnipropetrovsk Oblast